Fung Fung (1 December 1916 – 16 February 2000) was a veteran Hong Kong actor. He began his career as a leading man in 1946. An accident in 1949 left the left side of his face paralysed, but, while no longer able to attract leading roles, he enjoyed a long career as a character actor, appearing in films alongside such stars as Jackie Chan and Sammo Hung. He was the father of Fung Bo Bo, a child star of the 1960s, Alice Fung, a veteran actress, and Fung Hak-On, an actor known for playing villainous roles in several kung fu/action comedies of the 1970s and 1980s.

Filmography

Films 
This is a partial list of films.
 We Owe It to Our Children (1936)
 Xi nan er bo fu (1937)
 Chun hua qiu yue (1937)
 Ernu Yingxiong (1937)
 Gongzi Geer (1937)
 Hui Zuguo Qu (1937)
 Back to Our Nation (1937)
 Longcheng Feijian (1938)
 Maihua Nu (1938)
 Ernu Yingxiong Xiji (1938)
 Qimi Yang Jiagu (1938)
 Zhengui Guhanzhong (1938)
 Xiguan Si Meiren (1939)
 Zhen tou zhuang (1939)
 Zuihou de Banlu (1939)
 Sandao Jiulong Bei (1939)
 Zuihou Shengli (1939)
 Hongfu Nu Siben (1939)
 Daxia Gan Fengchi (1939)
 Daliang Adou Guan (1939)
 Sanxi Bai Juhua (1939)
 Yanzhi Ma (1939)
 Da Nao Sanmen Jie (1939)
 Yuannu Wang Fu Gui (1939)
 Yuanhun Ta (1939)
 Wagang Zhai (1939)
 Yi Si Yanluowang (1939)
 Zhao Kuangyin Ye Song Jing Niang (1939)
 Huoshao Shishi (1939)
 Wu Pan An (1939)
 Zhongguo Yeren Wang (1940)
 Yongzheng Huang Ye Dao Xiang Fei (1940)
 Di Quin (1940)
 Wang Zhaojun (1940)
 Tianding Facai (1940)
 Cixi Xitaihou (1940)
 Guanyin Dedao (1940)
 Yue Fei (1940)
 Wu hu ping xi (1940)
 Xiao Guang Dong (1940)
 Shiwan Tongshi (1940)
 Hongjin Wu (1940)
 Xu Rengui Zheng Dong (1940)
 Chayi Hu (1940)
 Renhai Leihen (1940)
 Dadi Huichen (1940)
 Yan Shuangfei (1941)
 Jin xiao chong jian yue tuan yuan (1941)
 Nu biao shi (1941)
 Chunse Manyuan (1941)
 Hua jie shen nu (1941)
 Xiao Laohu (1941)
 Minzu de Housheng (1941)
 Jietou Boshi (1941)
 Fenghuo Guxiang (1941)
 Xuegong Chunse (1941)
 Hongdou Qu (1941)
 The Red Bean Ballad (1941)
 Homeland in War (1941)
 Chenqi musao (1947)
 Hua yue liang xiao (1948)
 Si feng qi fei (1948)
 Yi guan qin shou (1948)
 Jiang hu tie han (1947)
 1950 Ji jia huan xiao ji jia chou
 1950 Xiadao Qinghua 
 1950 The Kid - Flash Knife Lee
 Ren hai wan hua tong (1950)
 1955 Qiu Haitang
 1955 Spanking the Princess
 1956 Love vs Love (aka Little Sweetheart) - Writer, director.
 1958 Feng huo jia ren
 1958 Fu ma yan shi
 1958 Shi wan tong shi - Juen Ging Gung
 1958 Dai chat ho see gei (1958)
 You qing ren (1958)
 Jing chai ji (1958)
 Li gui yuan chou (1959)
 The Orphan (1960) - Go Kong-lung
 Mong ngai ting Seung zap (1960)
 Ke lian tian xia fu mu xin (1960)
 Mu zi lei (1961)
 Ma sheng xiao yi ren (1962) - Old opera artist
 Man tang ji qing (1964)
 Zi ding xiang (1968)
 1969 Sam chiu liu
 1970 The Lonely Rider (aka The Gallant Boy) - Director, screenwriter, actor.
 1970 Yesterday, Today, Tomorrow  (aka Yesterday, To Day, Tomorrow, Zuo ri jin ri ming ri) 
 1975 Da jie an
 Gu huo nu guang gun cai (1975)
 Jin lian (1976)
 Enter the Fat Dragon (1978)
 Ha luo, ye gui ren (1978)
 The Young Master (1980) - Ah Suk
 Di yu wu men (1980) - Priest
 Ye che (1980)
 Qian zuo guai (1980)
 Lao shu jie (1981)
 Zhui nu zhai (1981)
 Security Unlimited (1981) - Driving Instructor
 Legend of a Fighter (1982) - Boxing promoter
 ru lai shen zhang (1982)
 Chong ji 21 (1982)
 Xing ji dun tai (1983)
 Lit foh ching sau (1991)
 Betrayal of Wang (2002) - (segment "100 Flowers Hidden Deep") (final film role)

References

External links
 
 HK cinemagic entry
 Fung Fung at hkmdb.com

1916 births
2000 deaths
Hong Kong male film actors
Male actors from Guangdong
People from Zhongshan
20th-century Hong Kong male actors
Chinese male film actors
Chinese emigrants to British Hong Kong